Symphyotrichum ericoides (formerly Aster ericoides), known as white heath aster, frost aster, or heath aster, is a species of flowering plant in the family Asteraceae native to much of central and eastern North America. It has been introduced to parts of Europe and western Asia.

The naturally-occurring hybrid species of white heath aster and New England aster (Symphyotrichum novae-angliae) is named Symphyotrichum × amethystinum and is commonly known as amethyst aster. It can grow where the two parents are in close proximity.

Description
Its leaves are sessile (stalkless) and narrow, becoming smaller towards the top of the plant and tips of the branching stem. It has white (rarely pinkish), composite flowerheads with yellow centers that begin flowering in late summer and last through fall.

It is commonly confused with Symphyotrichum pilosum, which co-occurs throughout most of its range. S. pilosum has larger flowerheads with longer ray petals. The phyllaries on S. pilosum are spine-tipped, while those of S. ericoides are not, although the curled edges may make them appear to be.

Taxonomy
Heath aster has two varieties: Symphyotrichum ericoides var. ericoides, which spreads by underground rhizomes to form colonies, and S. ericoides var. pansum  , which is cespitose, remaining in a clump, and has corm-like caudices.

F1 hybridization with Symphyotrichum novae-angliae can occur where the ranges of these two species overlap. The hybrid is called Symphyotrichum × amethystinum (amethyst aster) and is intermediate between the parent species in most respects.

Distribution and habitat
Symphyotrichum ericoides grows from Canada across much of the United States into the Mexican states of Coahuila and Nuevo León. The variety S. ericoides var. ericoides prefers open locations with sandy, gravelly, or disturbed soil.

Conservation
, NatureServe listed S. ericoides as Secure (G5) globally, last reviewed on 16 May 2016. On a US state and Canadian province and territory basis, it listed the species as Vulnerable (S3) in New Jersey, Pennsylvania, and Virginia; Imperiled (S2) in Mississippi; Critically Imperiled (S1) in Georgia and Kentucky; Apparently Secure (S4) in Iowa, Manitoba, Maryland, and Northwest Territories; and, Secure (S5) in Alberta, British Columbia, Montana, New York, Ontario, and Saskatchewan. It is reported as an Exotic in Québec. The remaining states, territories, and provinces have not been ranked.

Uses

Medicinal
Symphyotrichum ericoides has been used for medicinal purposes among indigenous people in North America. It has been documented that the Meskwaki have used the plant both to revive an unconscious person and in a sweatbath as an herbal steam.

Gardening
Cultivars of Symphyotrichum ericoides are planted in gardens. Plants sold in the horticultural trade labeled as Aster ericoides, the old name of the plant, are usually cultivars or hybrids involving the species S. dumosum, S. lateriflorum, S. pilosum or S. racemosum, a mistake that has occurred continuously since the 19th century.

The following are cultivars of S. ericoides that have gained the Royal Horticultural Society's Award of Garden Merit:
 'Blue Star'
 'Brimstone'
 'Golden Spray'
 'Pink Cloud'
 'Ringdove'
 'Snow Flurry' (of S. ericoides var. prostratum)

Citations

References

External links
Asteraea Lab - University of Waterloo
Symphyotrichum ericoides at Ladybird Johnson Wildflower Center, wildflower.org

ericoides
Flora of Canada
Flora of the United States
Flora of Coahuila
Flora of Nuevo León
Plants used in traditional Native American medicine
Plants described in 1753
Taxa named by Carl Linnaeus